Kothandaramar Temple is a Hindu temple located in the Tiruvarur district of Tamil Nadu, India, dedicated to Lord Rama, the seventh avatar of Lord Vishnu.

Location

It is located in the village of Adambar in Nannilam taluk. It is located at a distance of 3 km from Achuthamanalam.

Presiding deity

The presiding deity is known as Sri Kodhanda Ramar. There are also Sita, Lakshmanan and Hanuman.

Speciality
Very near to this location there are Ramayana related places such as, Thadakanthapuram, Nallamankudi, Valangaiman and Kollumangudi.

Religious significance 

This temple is one of the  *Pancha Rama Kshetras and considered the foremost among the five temples. Pancha means five and Kshetrams refers to holy places. All the five temples are situated in Tiruvarur district, Tamil Nadu.

 Sri Kodhanda Ramar Temple, Mudikondan
 Sri Kodhanda Ramar Temple, Adambar
 Sri Kodhanda Ramar Temple, Paruthiyur   
 Sri Kodhanda Ramar Temple, Thillaivilagam
 Sri Kodhanda Ramar Temple, Vaduvur

References 

 Pancha Rama Kshetras
Sarvam Rama Mayam
Sthala Puranam

External links

Hindu temples in Tiruvarur district
Vishnu temples
Rama temples